This is a list of television programming that are currently being broadcast or have been broadcast on Aniplus and Aniplus Asia in Singapore, Hong Kong, Indonesia, Philippines and Thailand.

Current and former programming

References

External links
Aniplus Asia

Lists of television series by network